The Denbighshire League was a league in the early days of Welsh football. Originally titled the Welsh Senior League, it ran from 1890 until 1902. It was mainly made up of teams from the Wrexham area, with sporadic entrants from Mid Wales and the North Wales Coast. It was one of the first organised Football Leagues in Wales. The league was resurrected in September 1903 under the name the Wrexham and District League.

Founding Members
The following clubs took part in the 1890-91 season.
 Druids FC
 Rhos FC
 Rhostyllen Victoria FC
 Rhyl FC
 Ruabon FC
 Westminster Rovers

Champions

References

Sources

Football leagues in Wales
Sport in Wrexham
Defunct football competitions in Wales